Kanayannur is a taluk and a village in the district of Ernakulam, in the Indian state of Kerala. Taluk is an administrative denomination in India.

History
Kanayannur Taluk was formed in 1762, and is one of the oldest taluks in the former Kingdom of Cochin.

Demographics
 India Census, Kanayannur had a population of 790212 with 390875 males and 399337 females.

The Kanayannr taluk office is situated at M G Road, Ernakulam. There is a village in Kanayannur taluk whose name is also Kanayannur. The Kanayannur village office is situated at a village called Eruvely. Kanayannur is also known as Palace Square. It is believed that there was a palace of king of Kochi in Kanayannur hence the place is named palace square.

Revenue villages in Kanayannur Taluk

Ernakulam
Elamkulam
Poonithura
Edappally North
Edappally South
Kalamassery
Thrikkakara North
Thrikkakara South
Kakkanad
Vazhakkala
Cheranelloor
Kadamakkudy
Mulavukad
Nadama-Thekkumbhagam
Thiruvamkulam
Maradu
Kumbalam
Kureekkad
Chottanikkara
Kanayannur
Udayamperoor
Manakunnam
Mulanthuruthy
Keechery
Kulayettikara
Amballoor
Edakkattuvayal

References

Villages in Ernakulam district